The 2022 season is Balestier Khalsa's 27th consecutive season in the top flight of Singapore football and in the Singapore Premier League and the Singapore Cup.

Squad

Singapore Premier League

U21

Women Team

Project Vaults Oxley SC (SFL1) 
(Deputy Chairman, Darwin Jalil is the President for the club)

Balestier United RC (SFL2)

Coaching staff

Transfer

In 

Pre-Season

Mid-Season

Loan In 

Pre-Season

Out 
Pre-Season

Mid-Season

Loan Return 
Pre-Season

Note: Both Kimura Riki and Ho Wai Loon returned to the club permanently after their contract ended.

Loan Out 
Pre-Season

Mid-Season

Extension / Retained

Friendly

Pre-Season Friendly

Mid-Season Friendly

Team statistics

Appearances and goals

Numbers in parentheses denote appearances as substitute.

Competitions (SPL)

Overview

Singapore Premier League

Singapore Cup

Group

Semi-final

Balestier Khalsa lost 9-1 on aggregate.

3rd/4th placing

Competition (U21)

Stage 1

All 8 teams will be each other in a round-robin format before breaking into 2 groups for another 3 matches.  A total of 10 matches will be played thru the season.

 League table

Stage 2

 League table

Competition (U17)

U17 League

League table

Competition (SFL)

Singapore Football League D1

League table

See also 
 2016 Balestier Khalsa FC season
 2017 Balestier Khalsa FC season
 2018 Balestier Khalsa FC season
 2019 Balestier Khalsa FC season
 2020 Balestier Khalsa FC season
 2021 Balestier Khalsa FC season

Notes

References 

Balestier Khalsa FC
Balestier Khalsa FC seasons
2022
1